Hashi may refer to:

 The Japanese name for chopsticks
 Hashiwokakero, Japanese logic puzzle
 Hashi Station, railway station in Gōtsu, Shimane Prefecture, Japan
 HashiCorp, open-source software company based in San Francisco, California

People
 Abdulkadir Abdi Hashi, Somali politician
 Ali Matan Hashi, Somali senior military official and politician
 Makoto Hashi (born 1977), Japanese professional wrestler
 Mohamed Hashi (died 2020), Somali politician
 Samira Hashi (born 1991), Somali-British model, social activist and community worker
 Shō Hashi (1371–1439, r. 1422–1439), the last king of Chūzan and the first king of the Ryūkyū Kingdom (today Okinawa Prefecture, Japan)
 Takayo Hashi (born 1977), Japanese female mixed martial artist
 Yoshi-Hashi, (born 1982), Japanese professional wrestler
 Yukio Hashi (born 1943), Japanese Enka singer and actor

See also
Hachi (disambiguation)

Japanese-language surnames